William Catesby (1450 – 25 August 1485) was one of Richard III of England's principal councillors. He also served as Chancellor of the Exchequer and Speaker of the House of Commons during Richard's reign.

The son of Sir William Catesby of Ashby St Ledgers, Northamptonshire (died 1478) and Philippa, daughter and heiress of Sir William Bishopston, he was trained for the law in the Inner Temple. As an aspiring lawyer Catesby initially progressed in the service of William, 1st Lord Hastings. He married Margaret, daughter of William La Zouche, 6th Baron Zouche of Harringworth; the couple had three sons. Upon the death of his father he inherited many estates in the English Midlands and was land-agent for many others. He was a member of the Council that ruled during the reign of Edward V. After Richard was enthroned, Catesby was one of King Richard's closest advisors. He served as Chancellor of the Exchequer, and as Speaker of the English House of Commons during the Parliament of 1484, in which he sat as knight of the shire for Northamptonshire. He also received a substantial grant of land from the king, enough to make him richer than most knights.

In July 1484, William Collingbourne, a Tudor agent, tacked up a lampooning poem to St. Paul's Cathedral, which mentions Catesby among the three aides to King Richard, whose emblem was a white boar:

(The dog here refers to Lovell's heraldic symbol, a wolf.) The poem was interpolated into Laurence Olivier's film Richard III, a screen adaptation of William Shakespeare's play. Collingbourne was hanged, drawn and quartered for this and other alleged treasonable activities.

William Catesby was one of the two councillors (the other being Richard Ratcliffe) who are reputed to have told the king that marrying Elizabeth of York would cause rebellions in the north. He fought alongside Richard at the Battle of Bosworth Field and was captured. Alone of those of importance, he was executed three days later at Leicester. The suggestion that he might have made a deal with the Stanleys before the battle comes from his will when he asked them "to pray for my soul as ye have not for my body, as I trusted in you."

After his death, his estates were largely confiscated by Henry VII. Catesby was succeeded by his eldest son, George, to whom the family seat of Ashby St Legers was later restored. Robert Catesby, leader of the Gunpowder Plot, was a descendant.

Notes

References

1450 births
1485 deaths
Chancellors of the Exchequer of England
Speakers of the House of Commons of England
People of the Wars of the Roses
Knights Bachelor
People executed under Henry VII of England
Executed people from Northamptonshire
English MPs 1484
People from West Northamptonshire District
Male Shakespearean characters
Date of birth unknown
People executed by Tudor England by decapitation
English politicians convicted of crimes